Teden dni do polne lune is a novel by Slovenian author Marjetka Jeršek. It was first published in 1988.

See also
List of Slovenian novels

References
Teden dni do polne lune, Grid.si, accessed 19 July 2012

Slovenian novels
1988 novels